Andrew Francis Michael Kennedy (26 November 1883 – 10 April 1946) was an Australian rules footballer who played for the Carlton Football Club and Melbourne Football Club in the Victorian Football League (VFL).

A policeman, he played for the police team after his two games for Carlton in 1906, before playing a single game for Melbourne in 1908.

Notes

External links 

		
Andy Kennedy's profile at Blueseum		
 

1883 births
1946 deaths
Australian rules footballers from Victoria (Australia)
Carlton Football Club players
Melbourne Football Club players
Benalla Football Club players